Mount Meron (Har Meron; , Jabal al-Jarmaq) is a mountain in the Upper Galilee region of Israel. It has special significance in Jewish religious tradition and parts of it have been declared a nature reserve.

Mount Meron nature reserve
In 1965, an 84000-dunam nature reserve was declared. An additional 1199 dunams were declared part of the reserve in 2005. It is the highest reserve in Israel, at an altitude of 1208 meters above sea level, and the largest reserve in the north of the country.

Religious significance

The village of Meron and the tomb of Rabbi Shimon bar Yochai are on Mount Meron. Leading up to the anniversary of his death on Lag BaOmer, thousands of people camp out along the slopes near the tomb, and on Lag B'Omer itself, hundreds of thousands make pilgrimages to celebrate the occasion.

Hiking paths 

The mountain has extensive undergrowth and cannot be climbed from every direction. The main path starts at the northwest side of the Meron village. There is a gate next to the road, with a color-marked path of about 10 km. There is also a path on the west side of the mountain.

Climate

Mount Meron has a Mediterranean climate (Köppen climate classification: Csa) with hot and dry summers and cool, wet and occasionally snowy winters. It snows briefly on Mount Meron a few times during every winter. There are 22 days a year with a temperature of 32 °C or higher and 28 days below freezing. Mount Meron has the second highest precipitation in Israel after Mount Hermon. Note: the chart is an average of 5 years so the record highs and lows may not be fully accurate.

Incidents
On May 17, 1911, the collapse of an eight-meter high roof caused 40 wounded and seven fatalities. As the nearby hospital was closed, people from the surrounding area donated bedsheets and equipment to assist the wounded.

At about 12:50 a.m. on April 30, 2021, hundreds of Israelis were trampled as they were leaving the mountain, having attended a Lag BaOmer celebration that drew an estimated 100,000 people in spite of a 10,000-people limit imposed due to the COVID-19 pandemic. At least 45 people died in the disaster, with hundreds injured.

References

Highest points of countries
Lag BaOmer
Mountains of Israel
Nature reserves in Israel
Sacred mountains